The 2013–14 season in Bangladesh was the fourteenth in which first-class cricket was played at the domestic level. The main domestic competitions were the National Cricket League (NCL), the Bangladesh Cricket League (BCL) and the Dhaka Premier League. The Bangladesh Premier League (BPL) was cancelled. Internationally, there were tours by New Zealand and Sri Lanka, and Bangladesh hosted both the 2014 Asia Cup and 2014 ICC World Twenty20 tournaments. The season was disrupted by civil and political disturbances caused by issues arising from the 2014 Bangladeshi general election.

International tournaments

2014 Asia Cup

Bangladesh hosted the Asia Cup for the second consecutive time from February 24 to March 7, 2014. The tournament featured Afghanistan, Bangladesh, India, Pakistan and Sri Lanka. However, it was an extremely disappointing tournament for the Tigers, as they lost to Afghanistan, Pakistan, and India.

2014 ICC World Twenty20

Bangladesh hosted the men's and women's World Twenty20 from March 15 to April 7, 2014 in Dhaka, Chittagong and Sylhet.

International tours

New Zealand in Bangladesh

The New Zealand cricket team toured Bangladesh in October and November 2013. The tour consisted of two Test matches, three One Day Internationals and one Twenty20 International. The matches were to be played in Chittagong and Mirpur. Both Test matches ended in draws, Bangladesh won all three One Day Internationals and New Zealand won the sole Twenty20 International.

Sri Lanka in Bangladesh

Sri Lanka toured Bangladesh in January and February 2014 playing two Test Matches, three One Day Internationals and two Twenty20 Internationals. Sri Lanka won every match, with the exception of the second Test match which ended in a draw.

Domestic competitions
Initially it was planned that the NCL would be held in November and December 2013, the BCL in May and June 2014 and the BPL in December and January. This plan was severely disrupted by the protests, strikes and blockades surrounding the 2014 Bangladeshi general election. Some tournaments were rescheduled as a result. The 2013–14 BPL was, in the end, cancelled but that was because all six franchises had been suspended by the governing committee for violating tournament regulations and the tournament's third edition was held in 2014–15 with six new franchises.

National Cricket League
The National Cricket League (NCL) was initially scheduled to take place in November and December 2013. It was later rescheduled to take place from January to April 2014 with a break for the World Twenty20.

Victory Day T20 Cup 

The 2013–14 Victory Day T20 Cup was a Twenty20 cricket competition that was held in Bangladesh. It was played by four Dhaka Premier League teams, from 22 December to 31 December 2014. BCB originally organised the tournament as the preparation and the criteria for selecting players for the 2014 ICC World Twenty20, scheduled to be played in early 2014. Prime Bank Cricket Club was crowned the champions of the tournament.

  advanced to the Final

Bangladesh Cricket League
The Bangladesh Cricket League (BCL) was initially scheduled for May and June 2014 but, in view of the national disturbances, it was contested in two parts. The first two rounds of the tournament were brought forward to January to fill a gap left by disruption to the NCL. There was then a break to let the leading players prepare for the Test series against Sri Lanka. The remaining rounds of the tournament were scheduled to take place in May after the 2014 ICC World Twenty20. South Zone defeated North Zone in the final.

Results

Final

Dhaka Premier League
Two editions of the List A Dhaka Premier League were scheduled. The first edition, held from September to November 2013, was initially scheduled for the 2012–13 season but was rescheduled due to the unavailability of players from the Bangladesh national team. The title was won by Gazi Tank Cricketers. The second edition of the league, that for the 2013–14 season itself, was cancelled by the BCB and was set to resume in 2014–15.

Women's matches

Pakistan women in Bangladesh
1st ODI

2nd ODI

1st T20I

2nd T20I

India women in Bangladesh
1st T20I

2nd T20I

3rd T20I

References

2013 in Bangladeshi cricket
2014 in Bangladeshi cricket
Bangladeshi cricket seasons from 2000–01
Domestic cricket competitions in 2013–14